The United States presidential state car (nicknamed "the Beast", "Cadillac One", "First Car"; code named "Stagecoach") is the official state car of the president of the United States.

United States presidents embraced automotive technology in the early 20th-century with President William Howard Taft's purchase of four cars and the conversion of the White House stables into a garage.  Presidents rode in stock, unmodified cars until President Franklin D. Roosevelt's administration bought the Sunshine Special, the first presidential state car to be built to United States Secret Service standards.  Until the assassination of John F. Kennedy, presidential state cars frequently allowed the president to ride uncovered and exposed to the public.  President Kennedy's assassination began a progression of increasingly armored and sealed cars; the 2009–2018 state car had  bulletproof glass and was hermetically sealed with its own environmental system.  The current model of presidential state car is a unique Cadillac that debuted on September 24, 2018.

Decommissioned presidential state cars are dismantled and destroyed with the assistance of the Secret Service to prevent their secrets from being known to outside parties.  Late 20th-century and 21st-century presidential motorcades have consisted of 24–45 vehicles other than the presidential state car, including vehicles for security, healthcare, the press, and route-clearing, among others.

History
The first serving president to ride in a car was President William McKinley, who briefly rode in a Stanley Motor Carriage Company steam car on July 13, 1901.  According to the United States Secret Service, it was customary for them to follow the presidential horse-and-buggy on foot, but that with the popularization of the automobile, the Secret Service purchased a 1907 White Motor Company steam car to follow President Theodore Roosevelt's horse-drawn carriage.  The president himself eschewed riding in the vehicle due to his "image as a rough-riding horseman".

William H. Taft

President William Howard Taft changed things at the White House, converting the stables there to a garage and purchasing a four-car fleet on a budget of : two "luxurious" Pierce-Arrow cars, a Baker Motor Vehicle electric car, and a  1911 White Motor Company steam car.  President Taft became a fan of the steam car when he discovered he could conceal himself from press photographers with a "carefully timed burst of steam."

Woodrow Wilson

President Woodrow Wilson was such a fan of the three Pierce-Arrow cars purchased by his administration that he bought one of them from the government for  when he left office in 1921.  President Warren G. Harding was the first president to use a car to drive to his inauguration, and was the first qualified driver to be elected president.  President Herbert Hoover had a Cadillac V-16.

Franklin Roosevelt
In 1936, President Franklin D. Roosevelt bought a Ford V8 Phaeton coupe and had it equipped with hand controls in direct contravention of a Secret Service directive prohibiting sitting presidents from getting behind the wheel of a car.

In December 1939, President Roosevelt received a 1939 Lincoln Motor Company V12 convertible—the Sunshine Special. The Sunshine Special (so named because the top was frequently open) became the president's best-known automobile, the very first to be built to Secret Service specifications, and the first to be leased rather than bought. Built on the chassis of the Lincoln K-series, the Sunshine Special has a  wheelbase, room for 10 passengers, rear doors hinged backwards, heavy-duty suspension, two side-mounted spare tires, and standing platforms attached to the exterior to accommodate Secret Service agents. The Sunshine Special underwent two sets of modifications. Firstly in 1941 the car's top was lowered  out of aesthetic concerns. Then, in 1942, after the attack on Pearl Harbor, the car underwent the addition of armor,  bulletproof glass, "metal-clad flat-proof inner tubes, a radio transceiver, a siren, red warning lights, and a compartment for submachine guns."

Truman/Eisenhower Cosmopolitans

Legend has it that Harry S. Truman held a grudge against General Motors because they would not give him use of their cars during his run for the 1948 presidential election; and, so, in 1950 he chose Lincoln to make the presidential state car. The White House leased ten Lincoln Cosmopolitans. The cars were modified by coachbuilder Henney Motor Company and Hess and Eisenhardt provided extra security features, with extra headroom to accommodate the tall silk hats popular at the time, and were painted black. Nine of the automobiles had enclosed bodies, while the tenth was an armored convertible especially for President Truman. All ten cars were outfitted with  V8 engines "with heavy-duty Hydra-Matic transmissions."

Kennedy Lincoln Continental

The convertible was painted "Presidential Blue Metallic", with silver metal flakes embedded within it; it was given the Secret Service code names of SS-100-X and X-100.

The dark-blue car included a "heavy-duty heater and air conditioner, a pair of radiotelephones, a fire extinguisher, a first-aid kit, and a siren." The car was  longer than Lincoln's because Hess and Eisenhardt had added a "middle row of forward-facing jump seats that folded away when not in use." The exterior featured improved, retractable standing platforms and handles for Secret Service agents, and flashing red lights recessed into the bumper. Both of these feature sets were designed to make the president more visible to the public, but they also increased the president's vulnerability (e.g., the assassination of John F. Kennedy).

After the assassination, the "Death Car" (as named by the Associated Press), was redesigned in an operation named "The Quick Fix". Hess and Eisenhardt, the Secret Service, the United States Army Materials and Mechanics Research Center, PPG Industries, and Ford engineers all collaborated to strip the limousine and improve everything. In an effort to prevent "ghoulish collectors" from obtaining the discarded car parts, they were destroyed. For an estimated cost of $500,000, the car was painted black and featured "improved telecommunications gear, a more powerful engine and flat-proof tires made of rubber-coated aluminum." The fuel tank was protected against explosion by a "porous foam matrix" that minimized spillage in the event of a puncture. Titanium armor was added to the body of the car, the standard windows were made bullet-resistant with sandwiched layers of glass and polycarbonate vinyl, and prototype aluminum run-flat tires were added.

In 1967, the convertible was modified again with an upgraded air conditioning system, an openable rear-door window, and structural enhancement to the rear deck.  Despite successive presidential state cars being built and delivered to the White House, the X-100 continued to be occasionally used by Presidents Lyndon B. Johnson, Richard Nixon, Gerald Ford, and Jimmy Carter until it was retired from service in early 1977.  , it was publicly exhibited at The Henry Ford museum in Dearborn, Michigan.

1967 Lincoln Continental
President Johnson preferred white convertibles, but "concerns for protocol and safety" had him receiving a black 1967 Lincoln Continental as his state car. This car also served Presidents Nixon, Ford, and Carter, and traveled to 32 nations before it was retired in the mid-to-late 1970s. In 1996, Ford restored the car to its original state and donated it to the Richard Nixon Presidential Library and Museum; the auto manufacturer chose Nixon's library because he took the car on several of his most-significant presidential trips.

1972 Lincoln Continental

A modified,  1972 Lincoln Continental was delivered to the White House in 1974. The fully loaded automobile also had external microphones to allow occupants to hear outside noises, full armor plate, bulletproof glass, and racks for the Secret Service to store submachine guns.

The car was used by Presidents Nixon, Ford, Carter, Ronald Reagan, and George H. W. Bush.  It was the vehicle in which Ford was shot at by Sara Jane Moore.  During the March 1981 attempted assassination of Ronald Reagan, the car was hit by the last two (of six) gunshots: the penultimate damaged the bulletproof window of the right rear passenger's door, while the last ricocheted off the back-right quarter panel and struck the president.  The car then transported Reagan to George Washington University Hospital.  After the 1981 shooting, the car was returned to Ford to receive a new interior, front sheet metal, and 1979 Lincoln grille.

1983 Cadillac Fleetwood

The next presidential state car was a 1983 Cadillac that was delivered on January 30, 1984.  This Cadillac Fleetwood is  longer and  taller than the stock Fleetwood.  It featured armor and bulletproof glass ( thick), and was described as "distinctively styled, with a raised roof and a large rear greenhouse."  To deal with the added weight of the armor, the car had oversized wheels and tires, heavy-duty brakes, and an automatic leveling system.

1989 Lincoln Town Car

Clinton Cadillac Fleetwood

President Bill Clinton used a 1993 Cadillac Fleetwood as his presidential state car.  It is currently on display at the Clinton Presidential Center in Little Rock, Arkansas, where it sits with all its doors closed to the public.  Museum curator Christine Mouw noted that they can "dust the outside of the car, but if we needed to get inside it, we would have to contact the regional Secret Service office".

CNN interviewed Joe Funk, a former Secret Service agent and driver of Clinton's presidential state car during part of his tenure.  Funk described a dichotomy of the car: while the president is wholly cut off from the outside world by the armor and bulletproof glass of the vehicle, he has at his fingertips communication capabilities including phones, satellite communications, and the Internet.

2001–2009 custom Cadillac

In 2001, for the first inauguration of George W. Bush, Cadillac no longer produced a car suitable for conversion into a presidential limousine. Furthermore, the additional armor and amenities that were added to the state car by the Secret Service taxed previous presidential limousines beyond their limits, resulting in failing transmissions and short-lived brakes. The George W. Bush state car was instead designed from the ground-up by "an R&D arm of General Motors in Detroit" to meet Secret Service specifications.   speculation" had President George W. Bush's Cadillac Deville actually based on the chassis of General Motors' line of full-size sport utility vehicles such as the "Chevrolet Suburban, GMC Yukon[,] and Cadillac Escalade." This "Deville" featured  armored doors, and "bulletproof glass so thick it blocks out parts of the light spectrum." Rumored components of the car were sealed passenger compartments with their own air supply, run-flat tires, and a  engine. Confirmed accessories include "an integrated 10-disc CD changer, a foldaway desktop[,] and reclining rear seats with massaging, adaptive cushions." Bush's presidential state car was nicknamed "The Beast", a name that persisted through the presidency of Donald Trump. When traveling, President Bush took along two of the armored limousines (flown by either C-5 or C-17), one for use and one for backup. This proved fortuitous during a 2007 trip to Rome where one of the presidential state cars stalled for five minutes on a street; the car was re-started, but was replaced with the backup limousine after President Bush reached his destination. Sometimes, President Bush would instead use vehicles already present at his destination such as embassy motor pool cars or military assets, rather than transporting the presidential state car. The president never used non-American-governmental vehicles when overseas.

2009–2018 custom Cadillac

The 2009–2018 presidential state car went into service on January 20, 2009 and drove President Obama the  down Pennsylvania Avenue from his inauguration to the inaugural parade. A Cadillac, the presidential state car was not based on any single model of car, though it had the "dual-textured grille and the dinner plate-sized Cadillac coat-of-arms badge" emblematic of the Cadillac CTS and the Cadillac Escalade. The headlights and taillights were identical to those used on other Cadillac production models. Anton Goodwin of CNET's Road/Show blog noted that speculation was that the presidential state car was based on the GMC Topkick platform. If that is to be the case, then Goodwin assumed the car would feature either a gasoline-powered  V8 General Motors Vortec engine or a diesel-powered Duramax  turbo V8 engine. Autoweek magazine asserted that the car ran on a gasoline-fueled engine. The presidential state car was maintained by the United States Secret Service.

The car had more  bulletproof glass than the previous model.  It also had run-flat tires and an interior that was completely sealed to protect the occupants in the event of a chemical attack.  The 2009 presidential state car model had night vision optics, a tear gas cannon, onboard oxygen tanks, an armored fuel tank filled with foam to prevent explosion, and pump-action shotguns.  Whether it was or was not armed with rocket-propelled grenades, the car featured  doors.  General Motors spokeswoman Joanne K. Krell said of the presidential state car, "The presidential vehicle is built to precise and special specifications, undergoes extreme testing and development, and also incorporates many of the top aspects of Cadillac's 'regular' cars—such as signature design, hand-cut-and-sewn interiors, etc."  The curator of The Henry Ford told The Dallas Morning News that President Obama's state car was "a tank with a Cadillac badge."

In 2013, the presidential state car was outfitted with standard Washington, D.C., license plates that read "TAXATION WITHOUT REPRESENTATION" in reference to the district's lack of representation in the United States Congress.  The switch came after the D.C. city council petitioned the president to use the plates on his motorcade, which would be seen by millions of people as the president headed down Pennsylvania Avenue for his second inauguration.

Current model

Development
In 2014, General Motors (GM) was awarded three contracts for the new limousine.  Each state car was expected to cost , and by January 2016, GM had been paid  for its work on the new model.

After prototypes of the new model were seen driven on public roads wrapped in monochromatic multi-scale camouflage, Cadillac confirmed to Fox News that "We've completed our task and we've handed over the vehicle to the customer".  The Secret Service confirmed that the program to replace the presidential car was "on track and on schedule" and should be in service by late summer 2018.  Fox News' Gary Gastelu opined that the camouflaged prototype looked similar to the Cadillac CT6.

Realization

Still nicknamed "the Beast" (as established with the 2001–2009 model), the current model debuted with a trip by President Donald Trump to New York City on September 24, 2018.  Road & Track reported that "the design appears to be a simple evolution of the old model with more current Cadillac design cues, like an Escalade sedan."  Road & Track described the state car as "massive and tall", and weighing .  NBC News reported a weight of 20,000 pounds and the capacity to seat seven, and speculated that the limousine was intended to evoke the aesthetic of the Cadillac XT6.  Business Insider reported in 2019 that the Beast is actually built upon a GM truck chassis.  Car and Driver said that the car was built on the GMC TopKick platform, weighs as much as 15,000 pounds, has the headlamps from the Cadillac Escalade, and the grille emblematic of the Cadillac Escala concept car.

In addition to defensive measures designed to protect the president, this state car also has stores of blood in the president's type for medical emergencies. The car is hermetically sealed against fluid attacks, and features run-flat tires, night-vision devices, smoke screens, and oil slicks as defensive measures against attackers.

, the current model was used alongside the previous model.

Destruction
In the late 20th-century, it was customary for the United States Secret Service to participate in the destruction of the presidential state car after it had run its course.  The federal agents use bullets and explosive rounds for two purposes.  The first is to demonstrate the automobile's effectiveness against such weaponry, while the second is to shred the vehicle and destroy the secrets of its manufacture, armoring, and defensive abilities.

Presidential motorcades

Motorcades involving the presidential state car are detailed, involved operations.  Motorcades under President George W. Bush involved up to two dozen cars; under President Barack Obama they constituted 30 other vehicles.

The Obama presidential motorcade included many other vehicles than the official presidential state car.  Involved were police cars to lead the motorcade and clear the streets; sport utility vehicles to carry the United States Secret Service detail, electronic countermeasures, key staff, a counter-assault team, "hazardous-materials-mitigation" personnel and equipment, and White House Communications Agency personnel.  Also included in the motorcade were press vans, an ambulance, and more.

The presidential state car is maintained by the United States Secret Service, while other support vehicles in the president's motorcade are maintained by the White House Military Office.  Due to difficulty in organizing motorcades, helicopters (Marine One) are preferred.

See also
 
 
 List of official vehicles of the president of the United States

References

External links
 

 
Cadillac vehicles
Lincoln vehicles